Kanaya is a Japanese surname. Notable people with the surname include:

Hideo Kanaya (1945–2013), Japanese Grand Prix motorcycle racer
Zeus (Japanese wrestler) (born 1982), who used the ring name Shigemasa Kanaya

Japanese-language surnames